= Dwarfism, low-birth-weight type with unresponsiveness to growth hormone =

- Specialty: Medical genetics
- Causes: Genetic mutation
- Prevention: none
- Frequency: very rare, only 2 cases have been described in medical literature
- Deaths: -

Dwarfism, low-birth-weight type with unresponsiveness to growth hormone is a very rare genetic disorder which is characterized by developmental delays, intellectual disabilities, and other anomalies. Only 2 cases have been described in medical literature.

== Signs and symptoms ==
People with this condition often show the following symptoms:

- Hearing difficulties
- Hypoglycemia
- Intellectual disabilities
- Fetal growth delays
- Severely short height

== Epidemiology ==
This condition has only been described in 2 brothers born to consanguineous parents. 2 of their other relatives were said to have been affected, but weren't examined themselves.
